The 1991 Detroit Tigers finished in a tie for second place in the American League East with a record of 83-79 (.519).  They outscored their opponents 817 to 794.  The Tigers drew 1,641,661 fans to Tiger Stadium in 1991, ranking 12th of the 14 teams in the American League.

Offseason
 November 26, 1990: John Shelby was signed as a free agent by the Tigers.
 December 3, 1990: Bill Gullickson was signed as a free agent by the Tigers.
 December 3, 1990: Buddy Groom was drafted by the Tigers from the Chicago White Sox in the 1990 minor league draft.
 January 11, 1991: Jeff Robinson was traded by the Tigers to the Baltimore Orioles for Mickey Tettleton.
 January 21, 1991: Skeeter Barnes was signed as a free agent by the Tigers.
 March 19, 1991: Torey Lovullo was traded by the Tigers to the New York Yankees for Mark Leiter.

Regular season
 In 1991, Cecil Fielder led all of baseball in home runs (44) and RBIs (133) for the second consecutive season. Once again, he finished second in the MVP voting. The MVP award was given to Orioles shortstop Cal Ripken Jr. Angry over missing out on the honor for the second straight season, Fielder lashed out at the voters, going so far as to accuse them of racism in their selection of Ripken, who was white.
 During the season, Bill Gullickson would be the last pitcher to win at least 20 games in one season for the Tigers in the 20th century.

Season standings

Record vs. opponents

Opening Day lineup
 
DH Tony Phillips
LF Lloyd Moseby
SS Alan Trammell
1B Cecil Fielder
2B Lou Whitaker
RF Rob Deer
C  Mickey Tettleton
3B Travis Fryman
CF Milt Cuyler

Notable transactions
 April 5, 1991: Scott Lusader was selected off waivers from the Tigers by the New York Yankees.
 June 3, 1991: Kevin Morgan was drafted by the Tigers in the 30th round of the 1991 Major League Baseball draft.
 June 11, 1991: Jeff Kaiser was signed as a free agent by the Tigers.
 August 5, 1991: John Moses was signed as a free agent by the Tigers.
 August 13, 1991: John Shelby was released by the Tigers.
 August 25, 1991: John Moses was released by the Tigers.

Roster

Player stats

Batting

Starters by position
Note: Pos = Position; G = Games played; AB = At bats; H = Hits; Avg. = Batting average; HR = Home runs; RBI = Runs batted in

Other batters
Note: G = Games played; AB = At bats; H = Hits; Avg. = Batting average; HR = Home runs; RBI = Runs batted in

Pitching

Starting pitchers
Note: G = Games pitched; IP = Innings pitched; W = Wins; L = Losses; ERA = Earned run average; SO = Strikeouts

Other pitchers
Note: G = Games pitched; IP = Innings pitched; W = Wins; L = Losses; ERA = Earned run average; SO = Strikeouts

Relief pitchers
Note: G = Games pitched; W= Wins; L= Losses; SV = Saves; GF = Games Finished; ERA = Earned run average; SO = Strikeouts

Awards and honors
Mickey Tettleton, AL Silver Slugger Award at catcher
Cecil Fielder, AL Silver Slugger Award at first base

League top ten finishers
Rob Deer
 MLB leader in strikeouts (175)
 #8 in AL in bases on balls (89)
 #9 in AL in at bats per home run (17.9)

Cecil Fielder
 Finished 2nd in AL MVP voting behind Cal Ripken Jr.
 MLB leader in home runs (44)
 MLB leader in RBIs (133)
 MLB leader in games played (162)
 #2 in AL in at bats per home run (11.2)
 #3 in AL in strikeouts (151)
 #6 in AL in total bases (320)
 #6 in AL in extra base hits (69)
 #8 in AL in plate appearances (712)
 #9 in AL in slugging percentage (.513)
 #9 in AL in runs scored (102)
 #10 in AL in runs created (110)

Travis Fryman
 #4 in AL in strikeouts (149)

Paul Gibson
 #7 in AL in games (68)

Bill Gullickson
 Finished 8th in AL Cy Young Award voting
 MLB leader in wins (20)
 AL leader in games started (35)
 #4 in AL in win percentage (.690)
 #4 in AL in bases on balls per 9 innings pitched (1.75)
 #7 in AL in earned runs allowed (98)

Mike Henneman
 #9 in AL in games finished (50)

Walt Terrell
 AL leader in hits allowed (257)
 #3 in AL in earned runs allowed (103)
 #4 in AL in losses (14)
 #5 in AL in complete games (8)
 #6 in AL in shutouts (2)

Mickey Tettleton
 #2 in AL in bases on balls (101)
 #4 in AL in at bats per home run (16.2)
 #6 in AL in home runs (31)
 #7 in AL in strikeouts (131)

Players ranking among top 100 all time at position
The following members of the 1991 Detroit Tigers are among the Top 100 of all time at their position, as ranked by The Bill James Historical Baseball Abstract:
 Lou Whitaker: 13th best second baseman of all time
 Alan Trammell: 9th best shortstop of all time

Farm system

Notes

References

 1991 Detroit Tigers Regular Season Statistics at Baseball Reference
 Detroit Tigers at Baseball Almanac

Detroit Tigers seasons
Detroit Tigers season
Detroit
1991 in Detroit